The Federal Medical Center, Devens (FMC Devens) is a United States federal prison in Massachusetts for male inmates requiring specialized or long-term medical or mental health care. It is designated as an administrative facility, which means it has inmates from different security classifications, from white-collar criminals to mobsters and sex offenders. It is operated by the Federal Bureau of Prisons, a division of the United States Department of Justice. FMC Devens also has a satellite camp housing minimum-security male inmates.

FMC Devens is located in north-central Massachusetts, approximately 39 miles west of Boston, on the grounds of Fort Devens, which occupied the land before it was scaled back in size.

Facility and services
Upon entering FMC Devens, new inmates undergo a month-long admission and orientation program to meet prison staff, acquaint themselves with the facility, and learn the facility's rules and regulations. They are introduced to the prison's inmate count system: prisoners are checked on five times a day. New inmates also receive a physical exam and educational, vocational, and psychological tests. Inmates at Devens are subject to random, unannounced urine and breathalyzer tests, as well as searches for contraband.

FMC Devens has regular onsite specialists in cardiology, nephrology, endocrinology, surgery, neurology and pulmonology. Inmates often leave the facility to see outside specialists and for tests and medical procedures not available in the medical center, according to Sandra Howard, the clinical director at FMC Devens.

Inmates are allowed six visits a month. Physical contact is allowed so long as it is not deemed excessive. An in-house psychology department offers inmates counseling for depression and suicidal ideation, as well as sex-offender and drug-addiction programs.  A chaplain offers religious services and counseling, and volunteers in a prisoner visitation service pay visits to inmates who do not receive many visitors. There are adult continuing-education classes and an electronic library where they can read up on new case law and sentencing guidelines. The prison has a recreation area for floor hockey, basketball, and soccer, a hobby craft room, and a music-practice room.

Notable inmates

Current
 Inmates currently held at FMC Devens.

Former 

 Inmates who have served time at FMC Devens.

See also
 List of United States federal prisons
 Federal Bureau of Prisons
 Incarceration in the United States

References

External links
 FMC Devens - official website

Buildings of the United States government in Massachusetts
Devens
1999 establishments in Massachusetts
Devens
Buildings and structures in Harvard, Massachusetts